Ludwig Hörmann (6 September 1918 – 19 June 2001) was a German cyclist. He won the German National Road Race in 1951 and 1952.

Major results
1939
 1st  Road race, National Amateur Road Championships
1942
 1st  Road race, National Amateur Road Championships
1946
 3rd Road race, National Road Championships
1950
 3rd Road race, National Road Championships
1951
 1st  Road race, National Road Championships
 1st Stage 14 Deutschland Tour
1952
 1st  Road race, National Road Championships
 3rd  Road race, UCI Road World Championships
1953
 1st Stage 4 Tour du Sud-Est
 3rd Grand Prix de Suisse (ITT)

References

1918 births
2001 deaths
German male cyclists
German cycling road race champions
Cyclists from Munich
20th-century German people